Hampole railway station was situated on the main line of the West Riding and Grimsby Railway between Carcroft & Adwick-le-Street and South Elmsall. It was close by and served the village of Hampole, near Doncaster, South Yorkshire, England.

The station, opened in January 1885, was a simple affair with wooden platforms and waiting shelters. There was a separate Station Master's house, which was situated at the roadside by the station approach.

The station closed on 7 January 1952.

References

 

Railway stations in Great Britain opened in 1885
Railway stations in Great Britain closed in 1952
Disused railway stations in Doncaster
Former West Riding and Grimsby Railway stations